Floruit (abbreviated fl. or occasionally flor.; from Latin for "flourished") denotes a date or period during which a person was known to have been alive or active. In English, the unabbreviated word may also be used as a noun indicating the time when someone flourished.

Etymology and use

Broadly, the term is employed in reference to the peak of activity for a person or movement. More specifically, it often is used in genealogy and historical writing when a person's birth or death dates are unknown, but some other evidence exists that indicates when they were alive. For example, if there are wills attested by John Jones in 1204, and 1229, and a record of his marriage in 1197, a record concerning him might be written as "John Jones (fl. 1197–1229)".

The term is often used in art history when dating the career of an artist. In this context, it denotes the period of the individual's artistic activity.

See also

 Reign (r., Latin )
 Tempore (temp.)
 Family tree

References 

Latin words and phrases
Verbs